Kool may refer to:

People
 Kool (surname), surname of Dutch origin
 Robert "Kool" Bell (born 1950), American bassist and founder of Kool and the Gang
 Roger Kool (1954–2005), Singaporean DJ (Roger Kiew)
 Kool DJ Herc (born 1955), Jamaican–American DJ and hip hop pioneer (Clive Campbell)
 Kool DJ Red Alert (born 1956), American DJ and hip hop pioneer (Frederick Crute)
 DJ Kool (born 1958), American DJ and rapper (John W. Bowman)
 Kool Moe Dee (born 1962), American  rapper (Mohandas Dewese)
 Kool Keith (born 1963), American rapper (Keith M. Thornton)
 Kool Bob Love (born 1967), American DJ, breakdancer and streetball player (Bobbito Garcia)
 Kool Shen (born 1966), French rapper, actor and producer (Bruno Lopes)
 Kool G. Rap (born 1968), American rapper (Nathaniel T. Wilson)
 Kool Kim (born 1971), American rapper (Kim Sharpton)
 Kool Savas (born 1975), German rapper (Savaş Yurderi)
 Kool Kojak (born 1970s), American musician (Allan P. Grigg)
 Kool A.D. (born 1983), American rapper (Victor Vazquez)

Broadcasting
 KOOL 96.5, the branding for radio station CKUL-FM in Halifax, Nova Scotia, Canada
 KOOL 97.3, the branding for radio station KEAG in Anchorage, Alaska
 KOOL 99.1, the branding for radio station KODZ in Eugene, Oregon
 KOOL 101.5, the branding for radio station CKCE-FM in Calgary, Alberta, Canada
 KOOL 101.7, the branding for radio station KLDJ in Duluth, Minnesota
 KOOL 101.9, the branding for radio station KFMH in Belle Fourche, South Dakota
 KOOL 105.1, the branding for radio station KXKL-FM in Denver, Colorado
 KOOL 105.9, the former branding for radio station KFBW (then KQOL) in Vancouver, Washington
 KOOL 107.5, the branding for radio station CKMB-FM in Barrie, Ontario, Canada
 KOOL 107.9, the branding for radio station KBKL in Grand Junction, Colorado
 KOOL 108, the branding for radio station KQQL in Anoka, Minnesota
 Kool FM, a pirate radio station in the UK
 KOOL-FM, a radio station (94.5 FM) in Phoenix, Arizona
 KKNT, a radio station (960 AM) in Phoenix, Arizona, formerly known as KOOL
 KSAZ-TV, a television station (channel 10) in Phoenix, Arizona, formerly known as KOOL-TV

Other uses
 Kool (cigarette), a brand of cigarettes
 Kool (film), a 2011 Kannada language film
 "Kool", a song by Benee from her 2020 album Hey U X

See also
 
 Cool (disambiguation)